Neocancilla takiisaoi is a species of sea snail, a marine gastropod mollusk in the family Mitridae, the miters or miter snails.

Description

Distribution
This species occurs in the Indian Ocean in the Mascarene Basin.

References

 Drivas, J. & M. Jay (1988). Coquillages de La Réunion et de l'île Maurice
 Cernohorsky W. O. (1991). The Mitridae of the world (Part 2). Monographs of Marine Mollusca 4. page(s): 110

Mitridae
Gastropods described in 1969